Iosif Solomonovich Bleikhman (1868–1921) was a Russian anarcho-communist revolutionary. He was the leader of the Petrograd Federation of Anarchist-Communists at the time of the Russian Revolution in 1917.

References

1868 births
1921 deaths
American anarchists
Russian anarchists
Anarcho-communists
Russian revolutionaries
Jewish anarchists